Wagner Municipal Airport is a small municipally-owned airport located to the south of Wagner, South Dakota. Its ICAO code is KAGZ.

References

External links 
 https://www.cityofwagner.org/airport

Airports in South Dakota